William Haynes was a British swimmer. He competed in the men's 400 metre freestyle at the 1908 Summer Olympics.

From 1905 to 1912 Haynes held all Scottish swimming championships from 100 yards up to half a mile. He was the first British amateur swimmer to swim 100 yards under the minute. His record—59 seconds—was achieved at the Scottish championships held at Leith.

By 1915 he had migrated to Western Australia and that year won the state's 100 yards championship.

In 1916 he married Mary Helena Philp in Perth, Western Australia. She died in 1947.

He was district officer of the Kalgoorlie Fire Brigade for almost ten years until being promoted in October 1943. His next appointment was to the Victoria Park District, Western Australia.

Haynes died at Victoria Park on 26 November 1954, aged 68. He was buried in the Presbyterian portion of the Karrakatta Cemetery, Western Australia.

References

External links
 

1954 deaths
British male swimmers
Olympic swimmers of Great Britain
Swimmers at the 1908 Summer Olympics
Place of birth missing
British male freestyle swimmers
Burials at Karrakatta Cemetery
1880s births
20th-century British people